Rachel Oniga (23 May 1957 – 31 July 2021)  was a Nigerian film actress.

Early life and career
Originally from Eku, Delta State in Southern Nigeria, although she was born on 23 May 1957 in Ebute Metta, Lagos State. 
She began her acting career in 1993, shortly after her divorce.
She worked briefly at Ascoline Nigeria Limited, a Dutch Consultant Company before her first movie titled Onome and her debut Yoruba movie was Owo Blow. Over the years, Oniga has featured in notable Nigerian films such as Sango, a movie scripted by Wale Ogunyemi, produced and directed by Obafemi Lasode and Wale Adenuga's television series, Super story.

Personal life
Oniga became a grandmother when her daughter Georgia delivered a baby.

Death
Oniga died on 30 July 2021 from a heart-related ailment.

Selected filmography
Owo Blow (1995)
Sango (1997)
Out of Bounds (1997)
Passion of Mind (2004)
Power Of Sin
Restless Mind
Doctor Bello (2013)
30 Days in Atlanta (2014)
The Royal Hibiscus Hotel (2017)
Power of 1 (2018)
Rise of the Saints (2020)
Inspector K (2020-2021)
My Village People (2021)
Progressive Tailors Club (2021)
Love Castle (2021)
A Naija Christmas (2021)
Surprise Wedding (2017) 
Chief Daddy 2: Going for Broke

See also
 List of Nigerian actresses

References

1957 births
2021 deaths
Nigerian film actresses
Actresses from Delta State
Actresses in Yoruba cinema
20th-century Nigerian actresses
21st-century Nigerian actresses